Monika Maštalířová (born 22 January 1977) is a Czech former professional tennis player.

Maštalířová reached a career high singles ranking of 412, competing in ITF Circuit tournaments, with all of her WTA Tour main draw appearances coming in doubles. She won 10 ITF doubles titles during her career.

From 2001 to 2004, Maštalířová played college tennis at Lynn University in Boca Raton, Florida. She was a member of Lynn's 2001 NCAA Division II Championship winning team and in 2003 was named SSC Player of the Year.

ITF finals

Singles: 4 (1–3)

Doubles: 18 (10–8)

References

External links
 
 

1977 births
Living people
Czech female tennis players
Lynn Fighting Knights women's tennis players
20th-century Czech women